The 1989 WNBL season was the ninth season of competition since its establishment in 1981. A total of 13 teams contested the league to start the season, but the Perth Breakers withdrew midseason.

Regular season

Ladder

The Perth Breakers had a 9–8 record at the time they withdrew from the season.

Finals

Season Awards

Statistical leaders

References

1989
1989 in Australian basketball
Aus
basketball